Boiu may refer to several villages in Romania:

 Boiu, a village in Ciumeghiu Commune, Bihor County
 Boiu, a village in Rapoltu Mare Commune, Hunedoara County
 Boiu, a village in Albești Commune, Mureș County